Abengourou Department is a department of Indénié-Djuablin Region in Comoé District, Ivory Coast. In 2021, its population was 430,539 and its seat is the settlement of Abengourou. The sub-prefectures of the department are Abengourou, Amélékia, Aniassué, Ebilassokro,  Niablé, Yakassé-Féyassé, and Zaranou.

History

Abengourou Department was created in 1969 as one of the 24 new departments that were created to take the place of the six departments that were being abolished. It was created from territory that was formerly part of Est Department. Using current boundaries as a reference, the department occupied the entire territory that is currently Indénié-Djuablin Region.

In 1995, the department was split in order to create Agnibilékrou Department. In 1997, regions were introduced as new first-level subdivisions of Ivory Coast; as a result, all departments were converted into second-level subdivisions. Abengourou was included in Moyen-Comoé Region.

Abengourou Department was split again in 2008 to create Bettié Department.

In 2011, districts were introduced as new first-level subdivisions of Ivory Coast. At the same time, regions were reorganised and became second-level subdivisions and all departments were converted into third-level subdivisions. At this time, Abengourou Department became part of Indénié-Djuablin Region in Comoé District.

Notes
 

Departments of Indénié-Djuablin
1969 establishments in Ivory Coast
States and territories established in 1969